Jānis Skredelis (29 December 1939 – 27 June 2019) was a Latvian football coach.

Career
Skredelis managed Soviet First League side FC Daugava Riga during the 1980s.

References

External links
 Interview of Janis Skredelis to Sport Express

1939 births
2019 deaths
People from Ilūkste
Soviet football managers
Latvian football managers
Latvian expatriate football managers
Expatriate football managers in Ukraine
Latvian expatriate sportspeople in Ukraine
Expatriate football managers in Iraq
FK Daugava Rīga managers
FC Metalurh Zaporizhzhia managers
Ukrainian Premier League managers